The Mandjindja or Mantjintjarra are an Aboriginal Australian people of Western Australia belonging to the Western Desert cultural bloc.

Country
Their western extension went as far as the Gillen and Throssell lakes. Their southern boundaries lay around Amy Rocks and the Saunders Range. Their eastern confines; lay around Lengama, identified provisorily as somewhere possibly east of the Sydney Yeo Chasm. They took in also Wardadikanja in the southeast.

Language

The language of the Mandjindja people is the Mandjindja language.

Native title claim
The Mandjindja and Ngalia sought recognition of their inherent land rights through the native title claim process in the Federal Court of Australia. A 1996 claim was dismissed.

In March 2009, the Mantjintjarra Ngalia claim came a step closer to recognition after passing the registration test of the Native Title Act. They claimed traditional ownership of the area from around Lake Wells in the east to Lake Darlot and Lake Miranda in the west to Cosmo Newberry through to Leonora and Lake Barlee up to Wiluna in the north. The application was discontinued in 2015.

Alternative names
 Mandjindjara.
 Mandjindji.
 Mangundjara.
 Mandjindjiwongga.
 Manjinjiwonga.
 Mantjila.
 Mangula.
 Kalgonei.
 Kalgoneidjara (Ngaatjatjarra language name for the Mandjindja and Wenamba).
 Nanggarangku.(Pitjantjatjara exonym used of the Mandjindja and the Ngalia, bearing the sense of 'hostile men')
 Mandshindshi.''

Notes

Citations

Sources

Aboriginal peoples of Western Australia